The Osobowice Cemetery is a large municipal cemetery in Wrocław (the capital of the Lower Silesian Voivodeship), Poland. It is located along Osobowicka 47-59 Street.

Famous people buried at cemetery include Adolf Anderssen among hundreds of others.

External links
 Cmentarz Komunalny Osobowice
 Cmentarz Osobowicki w portalu Wratislaviae Amici
 

Cemeteries in Poland
Buildings and structures in Wrocław